Glinik Gorlice is a Polish football club based in Gorlice, Poland.

Previous names
Glinik Gorlice has been known by many different names over time.

1921–1924 RKS Siła Gorlice
1924–1945 KS Karpatia Gorlice
1945–1948 KS Orzeł Gorlice
1948–1952 KS Związkowiec Gorlice
1952–1953 KS Unia Gorlice
1953–1965 MZKS Górnik Gorlice
1965–2001 GKS Glinik Gorlice
2001–2009 KS Glinik/Karpatia Gorlice
2009–     GKS Glinik Gorlice

Honours & Achievements
District League:Nowy Sącz:
Winners: 2012-2013
Polish Cup
1/64 (1st round proper) 2005-2006
Third Division
Runners-up: 1984-85

Season to season

Current squad

References

External links 
 Soccerway.com profile
 90minut.pl profile

Football clubs in Poland
1921 establishments in Poland